Ostrovec is a municipality in Písek District in the South Bohemian Region of the Czech Republic. It has about 400 inhabitants.

Administrative parts
The municipality is made up of villages of Dědovice, Dolní Ostrovec and Horní Ostrovec.

References

Villages in Písek District